PT ASI Pudjiastuti Aviation, operating as Susi Air, is a scheduled and charter airline based in Pangandaran, West Java, Indonesia. Sixty percent of the airline's operation serves commercial regular routes and pioneer routes while the rest is charter flights. The company currently operates from several main bases across the Indonesian archipelago. Susi Air is listed in category 2 by Indonesian Civil Aviation Authority for airline safety quality.

Although previously listed on the list of air carriers banned in the European Union, this was lifted on 14 June 2018.

History 
Susi Air was established in late 2004 by Christian von Strombeck, who worked as Director of Operations, and his wife Susi Pudjiastuti,  it was originally set up to transport the fisheries cargo of sister company PT ASI Pudjiastuti, because land transportation to Jakarta took around 12 hours, too long to maintain the freshness of the company's marine produce as they make their way into restaurants and merchants.

The 2004 Indian Ocean earthquake triggered devastating tsunamis along the Western coast of Sumatra. The two new Cessna Grand Caravans that had just been ordered by Susi Air were very quickly pressed into service transporting equipment and medicine for aid agencies. A Susi Air aircraft was the first plane to land in Aceh after the tsunami. During 2005 Susi's planes were chartered by NGOs in Aceh, rapidly grossing sufficient money for Susi Air to buy a new plane in 2006. This third Grand Caravan enabled the company to begin scheduled services out of Medan, capital of North Sumatra. In late 2006 this aircraft was moved to Jayapura, Papua, to establish a base in what is one of the more challenging flying environments in the world.

A fourth Grand Caravan was added to the fleet in early 2007 along with the addition of a new type, the Diamond Twin Star, for use on charter flights as well as opening up the possibility for Susi Air to train their own pilots. By the end of 2007 four additional Grand Caravans had been added to the fleet, along with the addition of two Pilatus Turbo Porters.

In 2008 a Diamond Star was added to the fleet for use by the Susi Flying School based at the company headquarters in Pangandaran, West Java, thus furthering the company's commitment to train local pilots. The ninth Grand Caravan arrived in May continuing the steady growth of the company. September 2008 saw the arrival of the tenth Grand Caravan. In October, the Diamond Star aircraft suffered an engine failure and successfully made a forced landing near Bandung. The first Garmin G1000 cockpit Grand Caravan arrived in April 2009, with another following shortly after. July 2009 saw the arrival of the first Piaggio Avanti.

Susi Air is known within Indonesia for hiring its pilots from overseas, mainly from Western countries, due to a lack of Indonesian born and trained pilots.  The country has strict rules regarding the number of foreign professionals any one company can employ. In a news article in 2011 Susi Pujiastuti stated that out of her 179 pilots, 175 were from overseas. Susi Air and its pilots were also documented in a documentary series called "Worst Place to be a Pilot", regarding the dangerous routes and runways that pilots experience.

Destinations 
Susi Air operates charter and scheduled flights from its bases all around Indonesia from Medan (North Sumatra), East Jakarta (Jakarta), Samarinda (East Kalimantan) to Jayapura and Merauke (Papua).

Susi Air operates the following services (at Desember 2020):

Indonesia
Java
Cilacap - Tunggul Wulung Airport
Jakarta - Halim Perdanakusuma International Airport
Pangandaran - Nusawiru Airport
Semarang - Achmad Yani International Airport
Pangandaran - Susi Int'l Pangandaran Beach Airstrip
Sumenep - Trunojoyo Airport
Surabaya - Juanda International Airport
Kalimantan
Banjarmasin - Syamsudin Noor Airport
Batulicin - Batulicin Airport
Datah Dawai - Datadawai Airport
Kotabaru - Stagen Airport
Long Apung - Long Ampung Airport
Long Bawan - Juvai Semaring Airport
Malinau - Robert Atty Bessing Airport
Melak - West Kutai Melalan Airport
Muara Teweh - Beringin Airport
Nunukan - Nunukan Airport
Samarinda - Samarinda International Airport (hub)
Samarinda - Temindung Airport (airport closed)
Tanjung Selor - Tanjung Harapan Airport
Tarakan - Juwata International Airport
Sulawesi
Masamba - 
Lesser Sunda Islands
Kupang - El Tari Airport
Larantuka - Gewayantana Airport
Lewoleba - Atambua Airport
Rote Island - David Constantijn Saudale Airport
Sabu Island - Sabu Airport
Maluku
Ambon - Pattimura Airport
Banda - Bandanaira Airport
Papua
Biak - Frans Kaisiepo Airport
Bintuni - Stenkol Airport
Fak Fak - Fakfak Airport
Manokwari - Rendani Airport
Merdey - Merdey Airport
Nabire - Nabire Airport
Sorong - Dominique Eduard Osok Airport
Serui - Sudjarwo Tjondronegoro Airport
Sinak - Sinak Airport
Wasior - Wasior Airport
Wamena - Wamena Airport
Sentani - Dortheys Hiyo Eluay International Airport
Merauke - Mopah Airport
Sumatra
Bengkulu - Fatmawati Soekarno Airport
Blangkejeren - Senubung Airport
Blangpidie - Blangpidie Airport
Banda Aceh - Sultan Iskandar Muda International Airport
Dabo - Dabo Airport
Jambi - Sultan Thaha Airport
Kutacane - Alas Leuser Airport
Letung - Letung Airport
Medan - Kuala Namu International Airport
Meulaboh - Cut Nyak Dhien Airport
Mukomuko - Mukomuko Airport
Padang - Minangkabau International Airport
Pangkal Pinang - Depati Amir Airport
Pekanbaru - Sultan Syarif Kasim II International Airport
Sibolga - Ferdinand Lumban Tobing Airport
Siborong-Borong - Silangit Airport
Simpang Ampek - Pusako Anak Nagari Airport
Simeulue Island - Lasikin Airport
Tanjung Balai Karimun - Sei Bati Airport
Tembilahan - Tempuling Airport

Fleet 
Susi Air is the largest operator of Cessna Grand Caravans in the Asia Pacific region; these make up the majority of the company's fleet. The company's fleet consists of the following aircraft:

Incidents and accidents
In October 2008, a Diamond DA-40 (registration PK-VVL) from Susi Air made an emergency landing on a firing range in the hilly Army Infantry Training Center compound, some 40 kilometers from the West Java provincial capital Bandung. The pilot was forced to make an emergency landing because of a fuel pump failure. The aircraft's propeller gear was damaged after hitting the ground on the uneven grass field. Besides the Pilot, the airplane was carrying two mechanics to fix another Susi Air airplane that had broken down at Nusawiru airport.

An investigation into this accident was conducted by the Indonesian National Transportation Safety Committee, which found that the pilot was not licensed in Indonesia, and that the accident was caused by fuel starvation due to the failure of a fuel pump. The committee said that Susi Air should ensure all pilots have sufficient licenses and that the engine manufacturer, Thielert, should review its engines in order to prevent similar incidents.

On 9 September 2011 a Cessna 208B Grand Caravan (PK-VVE) was destroyed when it crashed in the Pasema District, Indonesia. Both pilots were killed.
The airplane was carrying four drums of diesel fuel and some goods from Wamena to a remote airstrip.
It failed to arrive at the destination. The wreckage was found in mountainous terrain in the Yahukimo Regency.
The name of the airstrip has been named as Kenyem and Kenyam in Indonesian media. This is the same airstrip which is named Keneyan in the Australian Defence Force's Tactical Airfield Guide of the region.

Also on the same day, 9 September 2011, another Cessna 208B Grand Caravan (PK-BVQ) was mistakenly reported to have slid off the runway at Kupang's El Tari airport. The aircraft suffered a flat tire during landing and was stuck on the runway. As ground personnel arrived at the aircraft, the decision was made to push the aircraft off the runway in order to reopen the runway. The pictures taken of the aircraft on the grass led to a story of a runway excursion.
This incident resulted in the aircraft blocking the runway for 50 minutes causing two Boeing 737 commercial flights to divert to Makassar, South Sulawesi.

On 23 November 2011 a Cessna 208B Grand Caravan (PK-VVG) was destroyed after a go-around at Sugapa Airport in Nabire, Papua, killing the aircraft's co-pilot and leaving the pilot with severe injuries; the two crew were the only people on the aircraft, which was operating a cargo flight. The plane crash occurred after avoiding a runway jaywalker at a poorly managed runway in the Bintang Mountains. The pilot decided to go-around (i.e. fly back up), but the area was surrounded by mountains and cliffs, causing the accident. The exact cause of the accident however will be determined after further investigation. The National Transport Safety Committee released the final report on the accident on April 16, 2013.

On April 25, 2012 a PC 6 (PK VVQ) crashed in, Melak district, East Kalimantan killing the pilot and passenger who were engaged in an Aerial Survey of the area. The aircraft was reported missing at 1710 LT on 25 April with the wreckage found on 26 April, thus confirming the condition of the occupants/aircraft.

As a result of this safety record, United States Embassy personnel as of May 2012 are prohibited from flying on Susi Air. Similarly, Australian Government officials are not permitted to use the airline.

2023 hostage incident 
On 8 February 2023, a New Zealand Susi Air pilot was taken hostage in the Papua providence of Indonesia. Papuan separatists fighters abducted Philip Mark Mehrtens, and set alight to the Pilatus Porter aircraft he had just landed in a regional airport in Paro, Nduga. His captors stated they will not release Mehrtens “unless Indonesia recognises and frees Papua from Indonesian colonialism”.

Militants from the TPNPB movement took responsibility for the attack in a statement and stated that they would be targeting more foreigners in attacks.

References

External links
 
Official website
Air Pressure, documentary series

Airlines established in 2004
Airlines of Indonesia
Indonesian companies established in 2004